Werner Arnold can refer to:

 Werner Arnold (cyclist) (1930–2005), Swiss cyclist
 Werner Arnold (weightlifter) (born 1931), German weightlifter